Landsberger is a German surname. Notable people with the surname include:

 Benno Landsberger (1890–1968), German Assyriologist
 Mark Landsberger (born 1955), American basketball player
 Sam Landsberger (born 1988), Australian sports journalist
 Vytautas Landsbergis (Born 1932), Lithuanian Politician

See also
 Berlin Landsberger Allee station
 Landsberg (disambiguation)

German-language surnames